is a former Japanese football player. He played for Japan national team. He is currently working on television as a football commentator.

Club career
When Kitazawa was a junior high student, he played for Yomiuri Junior Youth. After being rejected by the club to advance to the club's Youth team, he entered Shutoku High School and played for the school club. After graduating, he joined Japan Soccer League side Honda in 1987. He was the top scorer of the league in the 1990–91 season.

He moved to Yomiuri (later Verdy Kawasaki, now Tokyo Verdy) in 1991. Kitazawa, together with his teammates Kazuyoshi Miura, Ruy Ramos, Nobuhiro Takeda, Tetsuji Hashiratani and Bismarck made in the early 1990s the golden era of Verdy who won the J1 League championship (1993 and 1994) and J.League Cup (1992, 1993, and 1994). He finished his playing career as a Verdy player in 2002.

National team career
Kitazawa was capped 58 times and scored 3 goals for the Japanese national team between 1991 and 1999. He made his international debut on 2 June 1991 in a friendly against Thailand in Yamagata Park Stadium, under national coach Kenzo Yokoyama. He was a member of the Japan team for the 1992 Asian Cup that Japan won. He scored his first international goal on 6 November 1992 in the semifinal against China at Hiroshima Stadium.

He took part in Japan's unsuccessful campaign to qualify for the 1994 World Cup. He was a member of the Asian final qualification stage that was held centrally in Qatar and played two games. He was on the bench when the Iraqi's injury-time equaliser dashed Japan's qualification hope in the last qualifier, in the match that the Japanese fans now remember as the Agony of Doha.

Kitazawa was short-listed for the 1998 World Cup, but national coach Takeshi Okada dropped him along with Kazuyoshi Miura and Daisuke Ichikawa at the final training camp in Nyon, Switzerland.

Futsal career
Kitazawa represented Japan national futsal team in the 1989 FIFA Futsal World Championship finals hosted by the Netherlands.

Career statistics

Club

National team

Honours 
Japan national team
 AFC Asian Cup: 1992

References

External links

Tsuyoshi Kitazawa at Japan National Football Team Database

1968 births
Living people
Association football people from Tokyo
Japanese footballers
Japan international footballers
Japanese men's futsal players
Japan Soccer League players
J1 League players
Honda FC players
Tokyo Verdy players
1992 AFC Asian Cup players
1995 King Fahd Cup players
AFC Asian Cup-winning players
Association football midfielders
Footballers at the 1994 Asian Games
Asian Games competitors for Japan